The Narus River may refer to:

 Narus River, Kapoeta, which mainly flows through Kapoeta East County in South Sudan 
 Narus River, Uganda, which mainly flows through Kidepo Valley National Park in northern Uganda

See also 
 Narus (disambiguation)